United States Steel Corporation, more commonly known as U.S. Steel, is an American integrated steel producer headquartered in Pittsburgh, Pennsylvania, with production operations primarily in the United States of America and in Central Europe. The company produces and sells steel products, including flat-rolled and tubular products for customers in industries across automotive, construction, consumer, electrical, industrial equipment, distribution, and energy. Operations also include iron ore and coke production facilities.

It was the 8th largest steel producer in the world in 2008. By 2018, the company was the world's 38th-largest steel producer and the second-largest in the United States behind Nucor Corporation.

Though renamed USX Corporation in 1986, the company was renamed United States Steel in 2001 after spinning off its energy business, including Marathon Oil, and other assets from its core steel concern.

History

Formation

J. P. Morgan formed U.S. Steel on March 2, 1901 (incorporated on February 25, 1901), by financing the merger of Andrew Carnegie's Carnegie Steel Company with Elbert H. Gary's Federal Steel Company and William Henry "Judge" Moore's National Steel Company for $492 million ($17.1 billion today). At one time, U.S. Steel was the largest steel producer and largest corporation in the world. It was capitalized at $1.4 billion ($ billion today), making it the world's first billion-dollar corporation. The company established its headquarters in the Empire Building at 71 Broadway in New York City; it remained a major tenant in the building for 75 years. Charles M. Schwab, the Carnegie Steel executive who originally suggested the merger to Morgan, ultimately emerged as the new corporation's first President.

In 1907 U.S. Steel bought its largest competitor, the Tennessee Coal, Iron and Railroad Company, which was headquartered in Birmingham, Alabama. Tennessee Coal was replaced in the Dow Jones Industrial Average by the General Electric Company. The federal government attempted to use federal antitrust laws to break up U.S. Steel in 1911 (the same year Standard Oil was broken up), but that effort ultimately failed. In 1902, its first full year of operation, U.S. Steel made 67 percent of all the steel produced in the United States. About 100 years later, as of 2001 it produced only 8 percent more than it did in 1902 and its shipments accounted for only about 8 percent of domestic consumption.

According to the author Douglas Blackmon in Slavery by Another Name, the growth of U.S. Steel and its subsidiaries in the South was partly dependent on the labor of cheaply paid black workers and exploited convicts. The company could obtain black labor at a fraction of the cost of white labor by taking advantage of the Black Codes and discriminatory laws passed in the late 19th and early 20th centuries by Southern states after the Reconstruction Era. In addition, U.S. Steel had agreements with more than 20 counties in Alabama to obtain the labor of its prisoners, often paying locals nine dollars a month for workers who would be forced into their mines through a system of convict leasing. This practice continued until at least the late 1920s. While some individuals were guilty of a crime, they did not receive payment or recognition for their work; many died from abuse, malnutrition, and dire working and living conditions. This practice of convict leasing was fairly ubiquitous as eight Southern states had similar practices and many companies, as well as farmers, took advantage of this.

The Corporation, as it was known on Wall Street, was distinguished by its size, rather than for its efficiency or creativity during its heyday. In 1901, it controlled two-thirds of steel production and, through its Pittsburgh Steamship Company, developed the largest commercial fleet on the Great Lakes. Because of heavy debts taken on at the company's formation—Carnegie insisted on being paid in gold bonds for his stake—and fears of antitrust litigation, U.S. Steel moved cautiously. Competitors often innovated faster, especially Bethlehem Steel, run by Charles Schwab, U.S. Steel's former president. U.S. Steel's share of the expanding market slipped to 50 percent by 1911. James A. Farrell was named president in 1911 and served until 1932.

In March 1908, the company formed the Committee on Safety of United States Steel following chairman Elbert H. Gary’s meetings on safety with casualty managers of the operating companies, thereby leading to the introduction of the modern “Safety First” movement. The committee’s formation was intended not only to prevent worker accidents, but to safeguard the company against criticisms and legal liability.

Mid-century
U.S. Steel ranked 16th among United States corporations in the value of World War II production contracts. Production peaked at more than 35 million tons in 1953. Its employment was greatest in 1943, when it had more than 340,000 employees.

The federal government intervened to try to control U.S. Steel. President Harry S. Truman attempted to take over its steel mills in 1952 to resolve a crisis with its union, the United Steelworkers of America. The Supreme Court blocked the takeover by ruling that the president did not have the Constitutional authority to seize the mills. President John F. Kennedy was more successful in 1962 when he pressured the steel industry into reversing price increases that Kennedy considered dangerously inflationary.

According to the author Dan Carter in The Politics Of Rage: George Wallace, The Origins Of The New Conservatism, And The Transformation Of American Politics, U.S. Steel strongly resisted Kennedy administration efforts to enlist Alabama businesses to support the desegregation of the University of Alabama, which race-baiting Gov. George Wallace had promised to block by standing in the schoolhouse door. Although the firm employed more than 30,000 workers in Birmingham, Ala., company president Roger M. Blough in 1963 "went out of his way to announce that any attempt to use his company position in Birmingham to pressure local whites was 'repugnant to me personally' and 'repugnant to my fellow officers at U.S. Steel.'"

In the postwar years, the steel industry and heavy manufacturing went through a restructuring that caused a decline in U.S. Steel's need for labor, production, and portfolio. Many jobs moved offshore. By 2000, the company employed 52,500 people.

The USX period
In the early days of the Reagan Administration, steel firms won substantial tax breaks in order to compete with imported goods. But instead of modernizing their mills, steel companies shifted capital out of steel and into more profitable areas. In March 1982, U.S. Steel took its concessions and paid $1.4 billion in cash and $4.7 billion in loans for Marathon Oil, saving approximately $500 million in taxes through the merger. The architect of tax concessions to steel firms, Senator Arlen Specter (R-PA), complained that "we go out on a limb in Congress and we feel they should be putting it in steel." The events are the subject of "The U.S. Steal Song"  by folk singer Anne Feeney.

In 1984 the federal government prevented U.S. Steel from acquiring National Steel, and political pressure from the United States Congress, as well as the United Steelworkers (USW), forced the company to abandon plans to import British Steel Corporation slabs. U.S. Steel finally acquired National Steel's assets in 2003 after National Steel went bankrupt. As part of its diversification plan, U.S. Steel had acquired Marathon Oil on January 7, 1982, as well as Texas Oil and Gas several years later. Recognizing its new scope, it reorganized its holdings as USX Corporation in 1986, with U.S. Steel (renamed USS, Inc.) as a major subsidiary.

About 22,000 USX employees stopped work on August 1, 1986, after the United Steelworkers of America and the company could not agree on new employee contract terms. This was characterized by the company as a strike and by the union as a lockout. This resulted in most USX facilities becoming idle until February 1, 1987, seriously degrading the steel division's market share. A compromise was brokered and accepted by the union membership on January 31, 1987. On February 4, 1987, three days after the agreement had been reached to end the work stoppage, USX announced that four USX plants would remain closed permanently, eliminating about 3,500 union jobs. The closure of so many plants created the term "rust belt" for a region of idle and derelict factories.

Corporate raider Carl Icahn launched a hostile takeover of the steel giant in late 1986 in the midst of the work stoppage. He conducted separate negotiations with the union and with management and proceeded to have proxy battles with shareholders and management. But he abandoned all efforts to buy out the company on January 8, 1987, a few weeks before union employees returned to work.

Recent history

At the end of the twentieth century, the corporation was deriving much of its revenue and net income from its energy operations. Led by CEO Thomas Usher, U.S. Steel spun off Marathon and other non-steel assets (except railroad company Transtar) in October 2001. It expanded internationally for the first time by purchasing operations in Slovakia and Serbia.

In the early 2010s, U.S. Steel began investing to upgrade software programs throughout their manufacturing facilities.

In January 2012, U.S. Steel sold its Serbian mills outside Belgrade to the Serbian government, as their operations had been running at an economic loss.

On May 2, 2014, U.S. Steel announced an undisclosed number of layoffs affecting employees worldwide. On July 2, 2014, U.S. Steel was removed from S&P 500 index and placed in the S&P MidCap 400 Index, in light of its declining market capitalization.

In October 2019, U.S. Steel announced a $700 million investment in Big River Steel, which became the first steel facility to be LEED-certified in 2017, in exchange for a 49.9% ownership interest. In December 2020, U.S. Steel announced it would acquire the remaining ownership interest in Big River Steel for $774 million. The acquisition was completed in January 2021.

In February 2022, U.S. Steel began construction on a new mill in Osceola, Arkansas which will be operational by 2024.

In April 2022, the electric arc furnace flat-rolled Big River Steel mill in Osceola became the first ResponsibleSteel site certified in North America following an independent audit by SRI Quality System Registrar (SRI).

Railroad ownership
U.S. Steel once owned the Northampton and Bath Railroad. The N&B was an  short-line railroad built in 1904 that served Atlas Cement in Northampton, Pennsylvania, and Keystone Cement in Bath, Pennsylvania. By 1979 cement shipments had dropped off such that the railroad was no longer economically viable, and U.S. Steel abandoned the line. A  section of track was retained to serve Atlas Cement. The remainder of the right-of-way was transformed into the Nor-Bath Trail. U.S. Steel also owned the Atlantic City Mine Railroad, whose  line in Wyoming operated from 1962 until 1983 and served an iron ore mine north of Atlantic City, Wyoming.

Through its Transtar subsidiary, U.S. Steel also owned other railroads that served its mines and mills. Those properties included the Duluth, Missabe & Iron Range Railway in the iron-mining region of northeast Minnesota; the Elgin, Joliet & Eastern that served its Gary Works in northwest Indiana; the Birmingham Southern Railroad serving the U.S. Steel mill in Birmingham, Alabama; and the Bessemer & Lake Erie and Union railroads in western Pennsylvania that delivered iron ore and provided plant-switching services at its mill complex in Braddock, Pennsylvania and coke works in Clairton, Pennsylvania.

U.S. Steel also owned a large Great Lakes commercial freighter fleet, under the Pittsburgh Steamship Company, that transported its raw materials from the Duluth area to Ashtabula, Ohio; Gary, Indiana; and Conneaut, Ohio. The laker fleet, the B&LE, and the DM&IR were acquired by Canadian National after U.S. Steel sold most of Transtar to that company. The ships are leased out to a different, domestic operator because of the United States cabotage law.

Inclusion in the Dow Jones Industrial Average (1901–1991)
U.S. Steel is a former Dow Jones Industrial Average component, listed from April 1, 1901, to May 3, 1991. It was removed under its USX Corporation name with Navistar International and Primerica. An original member of the S&P 500 since 1957, U.S. Steel was removed from that index on July 2, 2014, due to declining market capitalization.

Dividend history
The Board of Directors considers the declaration of dividends four times each year, with checks for dividends declared on common stock mailed for receipt on 10 March, June, September, and December. In 2008, the dividend was $0.30 per share, the highest in company history, but on April 27, 2009, it was reduced to $0.05 per share. In February 2020, the dividend was reduced to $0.01 per share but was then later increased back to $0.05 per share in November 2021. Dividends may be paid by mailed check, direct electronic deposit into a bank account, or be reinvested in additional shares of U.S. Steel common stock.

Legal issues

Labor
U.S. Steel maintained the labor policies of Andrew Carnegie. Carnegie believed that “good wages and good workmen I know to be cheap labor.” The Amalgamated Association of Iron and Steel Workers union that represented workers at the Homestead, Pennsylvania, plant was, for many years, broken after a violent strike in 1892. U.S. Steel defeated another strike in 1901, the year it was founded. U.S. Steel built the city of Gary, Indiana, in 1906, and 100 years later it remained the location of the largest integrated steel mill in the Northern Hemisphere. U.S. Steel reached a détente with unions during World War I, when under pressure from the Wilson Administration it relaxed its opposition to unions enough to allow some to operate in certain factories. It returned to its previous policies as soon as the war ended, however, and in a 1919 strike defeated union-organizing efforts by William Z. Foster of the AFL.

Heavy pressure from public opinion forced the company to give up its 12-hour day and adopt the standard eight-hour day. During the 1920s, U.S. Steel, like many other large employers, coupled paternalistic employment practices with "employee representation plans" (ERPs), which were company unions sponsored by management. These ERPs eventually became an important factor leading to the organization of the United Steelworkers of America. The company dropped its hard-line, anti-union stance in 1937, when Myron Taylor, then president of U.S. Steel, agreed to recognize the Steel Workers Organizing Committee, an arm of the Congress of Industrial Organizations (CIO) led by John L. Lewis. Taylor was an outsider, brought in during the Great Depression to rescue U.S. Steel. Watching the upheaval caused by the United Auto Workers' successful sit-down strike in Flint, Michigan, and convinced that Lewis was someone he could deal with on a businesslike basis, Taylor sought stability through collective bargaining.

Still, U.S. Steel worked hand-in-hand with the Birmingham (Alabama) Police Department as it vigorously investigated and targeted labor activities during the 1930s and 1940s. The corporation developed and fed information to a "Red Squad" of detectives "who used the city's vagrancy and criminal-anarchy statutes (liberally reinforced by backroom beatings) to strike at radical labor organizers." In the 1950s, those investigations shifted from labor to civil rights activists.

The Steelworkers continue to have a contentious relationship with U.S. Steel, but far less so than the relationship that other unions had with employers in other industries in the United States. They launched a number of long strikes against U.S. Steel in 1946 and a 116-day strike in 1959, but those strikes were over wages and benefits and not the more fundamental issue of union recognition that led to violent strikes elsewhere.

The Steelworkers union attempted to mollify the problems of competitive foreign imports by entering into a so-called Experimental Negotiation Agreement (ENA) in 1974. This was to provide for arbitration if the parties were not able to reach an agreement on any new collective bargaining agreements, thereby preventing disruptive strikes. The ENA failed to stop the decline of the steel industry in the U.S.

U.S. Steel and the other employers terminated the ENA in 1984. In 1986, U.S. Steel employees stopped work after a dispute over contract terms, characterized by the company as a strike and by the union as a lockout. In a letter to striking employees in 1986, Johnston warned, "There are not enough seats in the steel lifeboat for everybody." In addition to reducing the role of unions, the steel industry had sought to induce the federal government to take action to counteract the dumping of steel by foreign producers at below-market prices. Neither the concessions nor anti-dumping laws have restored the industry to the health and prestige it once had.

In December 2022, a new four-year contract was ratified between members of the United Steelworkers union and U.S. Steel. This contract covers 11,000 workers at 13 locations. The new agreements were retroactive to September 1, 2022, and included a 5% base wage increase each year for the four years, a $4,000 bonus upon ratification of the deal, $0.50/hour increase in hourly contributions to the Steel Workers Pension Trust, $0.10/hour increase in 401(k) contributions, and uncapped profit-sharing.

Environmental record
During the 1948 Donora smog, an air inversion trapped industrial effluent (air pollution) from the American Steel and Wire plant and U.S. Steel's Donora Zinc Works in Donora, Pennsylvania.

In three days, 20 people died... After the inversion lifted, another 50 died, including Lukasz Musial, the father of baseball great Stan Musial. Hundreds more lived the rest of their lives with damaged lungs and hearts. But another 40 years would pass before the whole truth about Donora's bad air made public-health history.

Today the Donora Smog Museum in that city tells of the influence that the hazardous Donora Smog had on the air quality standards enacted by the federal government in subsequent years.

Researchers at the Political Economy Research Institute have ranked U.S. Steel as the 58th-greatest corporate producer of air pollution in the United States (down from their 2000 ranking as the second-greatest). In 2008, the company released more than one million kg (2.2 million pounds) of toxins, chiefly ammonia, hydrochloric acid, ethylene, zinc compounds, methanol, and benzene, but including manganese, cyanide, and chromium compounds. In 2004, the city of River Rouge, Michigan, and the residents of River Rouge and the nearby city of Ecorse filed a class-action lawsuit against the company for "the release and discharge of air particulate matter...and other toxic and hazardous substances" at its River Rouge plant.

The company has also been implicated in generating water pollution and toxic waste. In 1993, the Environmental Protection Agency (EPA) issued an order for U.S. Steel to clean up a site on the Delaware River in Fairless Hills, Pennsylvania, where the soil had been contaminated with arsenic, lead, and other heavy metals, as well as naphthalene. Groundwater at the site was found to be polluted with polycyclic aromatic hydrocarbons and trichloroethylene (TCE). In 2005, the EPA, United States Department of Justice, and the State of Ohio reached a settlement requiring U.S. Steel to pay more than $100,000 in penalties and $294,000 in reparations in answer to allegations that the company illegally released pollutants into Ohio waters.  U.S. Steel's Gary, Indiana facility has been repeatedly charged with discharging polluted wastewater into Lake Michigan and the Grand Calumet River. In 1998 the company agreed to payment of a $30 million settlement to clean up contaminated sediments from a five-mile (8 km) stretch of the river.

With the exception of the Fairless Hills and Gary facilities, the lawsuits concern facilities acquired by U.S. Steel via its 2003 purchase of National Steel Corporation, not its historic facilities.

In 2021, U. S. Steel announced a goal to target net-zero carbon emissions by 2050. The company previously set a target to reduce greenhouse gas emissions intensity by 20% by 2030.

Legacy

U.S. Steel Tower
The U.S. Steel Tower in Pittsburgh, Pennsylvania, is named after the company and since 1970, the company's corporate headquarters have been located there.  It is the tallest skyscraper in the downtown Pittsburgh skyline, built out of the company's Corten Steel.  New York City's One Liberty Plaza was also built by the corporation as that city's U.S. Steel Tower in 1973.

Steelmark logo

When the Steelmark logo was created, U.S. Steel attached the following meaning to it: "Steel lightens your work, brightens your leisure and widens your world." The logo was used as part of a major marketing campaign to educate consumers about how important steel is in people's daily lives. The Steelmark logo was used in print, radio and television ads as well as on labels for all steel products, from steel tanks to tricycles to filing cabinets.

In the 1960s, U.S. Steel turned over the Steelmark program to the AISI, where it came to represent the steel industry as a whole. During the 1970s, the logo's meaning was extended to include the three materials used to produce steel: yellow for coal, orange for ore and blue for steel scrap. In the late 1980s, when the AISI founded the Steel Recycling Institute (SRI), the logo took on a new life reminiscent of its 1950s meaning.

The Pittsburgh Steelers professional football team borrowed elements of its logo, a circle containing three hypocycloids, from the Steelmark logo belonging to the American Iron and Steel Institute (AISI) and created by U.S. Steel. In the 1950s, when helmet logos became popular, the Steelers added players' numbers to either side of their gold helmets. Later that decade, the numbers were removed and in 1962, Cleveland's Republic Steel suggested to the Steelers that they use the Steelmark as a helmet logo.

U.S. Steel financed and constructed the Unisphere in Flushing Meadows-Corona Park, Queens, New York, for the 1964 World's Fair. It is the largest globe ever made and is one of the world's largest free-standing sculptures.

Fabrication of Chicago Picasso sculpture
The Chicago Picasso sculpture was fabricated by U.S. Steel in Gary, Indiana, before being disassembled and relocated to Chicago.  U.S. Steel donated the steel for the construction of St. Michael's Catholic Church in Chicago since 90 percent of the parishioners worked at its mills.

United States Steel Hour television program and Walt Disney World involvement
U.S. Steel sponsored The United States Steel Hour television program from 1945 until 1963 on CBS.  U.S. Steel built both the Disney's Contemporary Resort and the Disney's Polynesian Resort in 1971 at Walt Disney World, in part to showcase its residential steel building "modular" products to high-end and luxury consumers.

This same U.S. Steel manufacturing plant that was located on Disney property also helped build the now defunct Court of Flags Resort in Orlando, Florida, on Major Blvd.

Real estate development
U.S. Steel was also involved with Florida real estate development including building beachfront condominiums during the 1970s, such as Sand Key near Daytona Beach, Florida, and the Pasadena Yacht and Country Club near St. Petersburg, Florida.

Facilities

U.S. Steel has multiple domestic and international facilities.

Of note in the United States is Clairton Works, Edgar Thomson Works, and Irvin Plant, which are all members of Mon Valley Works  just outside Pittsburgh, Pennsylvania. Clairton Works is the largest coking facility in North America. Edgar Thomson Works is one of the oldest steel mills in the world. The company acquired Great Lakes Works and Granite City Works, both large integrated steel mills, in 2003 and is partnered with Severstal North America in operating the world's largest electro-galvanizing line, Double Eagle Steel Coating Company at the historic Rouge complex in Dearborn, Michigan.

U.S. Steel's largest domestic facility is Gary Works, in Gary, Indiana, on the shore of Lake Michigan. For many years, the Gary Works Plant was the world-largest steel mill and it remains the largest integrated mill in North America. It was built in 1906 and has been operating since June 28, 1908. Gary is also home to the U.S. Steel Yard baseball stadium.

U.S. Steel operates a tin mill in East Chicago now known as East Chicago Tin. The mill was idled in 2015, but reopened shortly after. The mill was then 'permanently idled' in 2019, however the facility remains in possession of the corporation as of early 2020.

U.S. Steel operates a sheet and tin finishing facility in Portage, Indiana, known as Midwest Plant, acquired after the National Steel Corporation bankruptcy. U.S. Steel acquired National Steel Corporation in May 2003 for $850 million and assumption of $200 million in debt. U.S. Steel operates Great Lakes Works in Ecorse, Michigan, Midwest Plant in Portage, Indiana, and Granite City Steel in Granite City, Illinois.  In 2008 a major expansion of Granite City was announced, including a new coke plant with an annual capacity of 650,000 tons.

U.S. Steel operates Fairfield Works in Fairfield, Alabama (Birmingham), employing 1,500 people, and operates a sheet galvanizing operation at the Fairless Works facility in Fairless Hills, Pennsylvania, employing 75 people.

U.S. Steel operates three pipe mills: Fairfield Tubular Operations in Fairfield, Alabama (Birmingham), McKeesport Tubular Operations, in McKeesport, Pennsylvania, and Texas Operations (Formerly Lone Star Steel) in Lone Star, Texas. A fourth pipe mill, Lorain Tubular Operations in Lorain, Ohio is no longer operating at this time. 

U.S. Steel operates two major taconite mining and pelletizing operations in northeastern Minnesota's Iron Range under the operating name Minnesota Ore Operations. The Minntac mine is located near Mountain Iron, Minnesota, and the Keetac mine is near Keewatin, Minnesota.  U.S. Steel announced on February 1, 2008, that it would be investing approximately $300 million in upgrading (project later abandoned) the operations at Keetac, a facility purchased in 2003 from the now-defunct National Steel Corporation. In December 2022, an investment of $150 million was made in the plant.

U.S. Steel has completely closed nine of its major integrated mills. The Duluth Works in Duluth, Minnesota, closed in 1973. The Ohio Works and Macdonald Works in Youngstown, Ohio, closed in 1980, the Duquesne Works in Duquesne, Pennsylvania, and Ensley Works in Ensley, Alabama in 1984, the Homestead Works in Homestead, Pennsylvania, in 1986. Geneva Steel in Vineyard, Utah, was sold in 1987, South Chicago's South Works closed in 1992, followed by the National Tube Works in Mckeesport, Pennsylvania, in 2014.

Internationally, U.S. Steel operates facilities in Slovakia (former East Slovakian Iron Works in Košice). It also operated facilities in Serbia – former Sartid with facilities in Smederevo (steel plant, hot and cold mill) and Šabac (tin mill).

U.S. Steel added facilities in Texas with the purchase of Lone Star Steel Company in 2007.

The company operates two joint ventures in Pittsburg, California, with POSCO of South Korea.

U.S. Steel added facilities in Hamilton and Nanticoke, Ontario, Canada, with the purchase of Stelco (now U.S. Steel Canada) in 2007. These facilities were sold in 2016 to venture capital firm Bedrock Resources and has since been renamed Stelco. The blast furnaces in Hamilton have not been reactivated as they were shut down by U.S. Steel in 2013, but those at Nanticoke are functional.

The company opened a training facility, the Mon Valley Works Training Hub, in Duquesne, Pennsylvania, in 2008. The state-of-the-art facility, located on a portion of the property once occupied by the company's Duquesne Works, serves as the primary training site for employees at U.S. Steel's three Pittsburgh-area Mon Valley Works locations. This site also served as the company's temporary technical support headquarters during the 2009 G20 Summit.

In January 2021, U.S. Steel fully acquired Big River Steel in northeast Arkansas.  In February 2022, U.S. Steel began construction of a new mill in Osceola, Arkansas, which is expected to be operational by 2024.The new Osceola plant will be adjacent to U.S. Steel's Big River Steel. Together the facilities will be known as Big River Steel Works.

In June 2022, U.S. Steel signed a non-binding letter of intent with SunCoke Energy that would allow SunCoke to purchase two blast furnaces from U.S. Steel’s Granite City Works for use in pig iron fabrication.

List of presidents and chairmen

Presidents
Charles M. Schwab (1901–1903)
Elbert H. Gary (1903–1911)
James Augustine Farrell, Sr.– (1911–1932)
William A. Irvin (19 April 1932 – 1 January 1938)
Benjamin Franklin Fairless (1938–1952)
Clifford Hood (1952–1959)
Walter Munford (18 May 1959 – 29 September 1959)
Leslie B. Worthington (1959–1967)
Edwin H. Gott (1967–1969)
Edgar B. Speer (1969–1973)
David M. Roderick (1973–1979)
William R. Roesch (1979–1983)
Charles A. Corry (25 January 1988 – 31 May 1989)
Thomas J. Usher (1994–1995)
Paul J. Wilhelm (1994–2001)
Thomas J. Usher (2001–2003)
John Surma (2003–2013)
Mario Longhi— President & CEO of U.S. Steel (September 1, 2013 – May 10, 2017)
David Burritt— President & CEO (May 10, 2017 – present)

Chairmen of the Board of Directors
Elbert Henry Gary (1901–1927)
J.P. Morgan Jr. (1927–1932)
Myron C. Taylor (1932–1938)
Edward Stettinius Jr. (1938–1940)
Irving Sands Olds (1940–1952)
Benjamin Franklin Fairless— Chairman & CEO of U.S. Steel (1952–1955)
Roger Blough— Chairman & CEO (3 May 1955 – 31 January 1969)
Edwin H. Gott— Chairman & CEO (January 31, 1969 – March 1, 1973)
Edgar B. Speer— Chairman & CEO (March 1, 1973 – April 24, 1979)
David M. Roderick— Chairman & CEO (April 24, 1979 – May 31, 1989)
Charles A. Corry— Chairman & CEO (May 31, 1989 – July 1, 1995)
Thomas Usher— Chairman & CEO (July 1, 1995 – October 1, 2004)
John Surma— Chairman & CEO (October 1, 2004 – December 31, 2013)
David S. Sutherland— Non-executive Chairman of the Board (2014—present)

See also

History of the steel industry (1850–1970)
Iron and steel industry in the United States
Weathering steel

References

Bibliography
 Brawley, Mark R. " 'And we would have the field': US Steel and American trade policy, 1908–1912." Business and Politics 19.3 (2017): 424-453.

 
 
 Hall, Christopher G.L. Steel phoenix: The fall and rise of the US steel industry (Palgrave Macmillan, 1997)
 
 
 
 
 Seely, Bruce Edsall, ed. Iron and Steel in the Twentieth Century (Facts on File, 1994)  512pp, an encyclopedia
 
 
 
 Warren, Kenneth. The American steel industry, 1850–1970: a geographical interpretation (University of Pittsburgh Press, 1987)

External links

 

 U.S. Steel Gary Works Photograph Collection, 1906–1971
U.S. Steel Movie clip of the Contemporary Resort Construction, on BigFloridaCountry.com
 The "World's Largest Plate Mill," formerly a part of U.S. Steel-Gary Works
History of the United States Steel Corporation, 1873–2011
Guide to United States Steel Corporation. Training manuals. 5342. Kheel Center for Labor-Management Documentation and Archives, Martin P. Catherwood Library, Cornell University.
Fortune Magazine 1959 "Fortune 500" list

Archives and records
United States Steel Corporation photographs at Baker Library Special Collections, Harvard Business School.

 
Manufacturing companies established in 1901
Metals monopolies
Companies listed on the New York Stock Exchange
Former components of the Dow Jones Industrial Average
Historic American Engineering Record in Pennsylvania
1901 establishments in Pennsylvania
1901 mergers and acquisitions